Terence ("Terry") Arthur Walsh (born 20 November 1953) is a field hockey coach and a former player who played as a striker for Australia. He represented Australia in two Olympic Games, winning a silver medal at the 1976 Games in Montreal. Following his playing career, he became a coach and had successful spells with Australia and Netherlands. He also coached the Indian men's team and guided the team to its first gold medal at the Asian Games after 16 years.

Coaching career
Walsh was the head coach of the Australia men's national team during the 1990s. Under him, the team won gold medals at the 1998 Commonwealth Games and 1999 Champions Trophy and bronze at the 2000 Olympic Games. He then coached the Netherlands men's team to a silver medal finish at the 2004 Olympics. He was appointed as the coach of the India men's team in 2013, before he submitted his resignation in October 2014, citing "difficulty adjusting to the decision making style of the sporting bureaucracy in India" as the reason. However, he withdrew his resignation the next day. Under him, at the 2014 Asian Games, the team won the gold medal, its first in 16 years. Citing "bureaucratic interference", he quit again in November 2014. In 2014 he became the head coach of Kalinga Lancers in the Hockey India League.

References

External links
 
 Profile on USA Field Hockey

1953 births
Australian male field hockey players
Olympic field hockey players of Australia
Field hockey players at the 1976 Summer Olympics
Field hockey players at the 1984 Summer Olympics
Living people
Australian field hockey coaches
Olympic silver medalists for Australia
People from Kalgoorlie
Olympic medalists in field hockey
Field hockey people from Western Australia
Australian people of Anglo-Indian descent
Australian sportspeople of Indian descent
Anglo-Indian people
Medalists at the 1976 Summer Olympics
Australian Olympic coaches
Australian expatriate sportspeople in the Netherlands
Expatriate field hockey players
Coaches at the 2004 Summer Olympics